Sarasol may refer to:

 Enric Sarasol, Sarasol I, Valencian pilotari
 José María Sarasol, Sarasol II, Valencian pilotari